The Handball events at the 1990 Asian Games were held in Beijing, China between September 26 and October 5, 1990.

South Korea won both men's and women's gold medals in round robin competitions.

Medalists

Medal table

Final standing

Men

Women

References
 Results - Men
 Results - Women

External links
 Asian Handball Federation

 
1990 Asian Games events
1990
Asian Games
1990 Asian Games